Lenka Ovečková (born 16 November 1995) is a Slovak female volleyball player. She is part of the Slovakia women's national volleyball team. She competed at the 2019 Women's European Volleyball Championship.

Clubs
  ŠŠK Bilíkova Bratislava (none–2012)
  VISTA real Pezinok (2012–2013)
  Doprastav Bratislava (2012–2014)
  BVK Bratislava (2014–2017)
  Strabag VC FTVŠ UK Bratislava (2017–2019)
  PVK Olymp Praha (2019–present)

References

External links 

 Profile on Women Volleybox
 Profile on CEV

1995 births
Living people
Slovak women's volleyball players
Sportspeople from Bratislava